Joseph Anthony Buttigieg II (May 20, 1947 – January 27, 2019) was a Maltese-American literary scholar and translator. He served as William R. Kenan Jr. Professor of English at the University of Notre Dame until his retirement in 2017, when he was named professor emeritus. Buttigieg co-translated and co-edited the three-volume English edition of Antonio Gramsci's Prison Notebooks.

Early life and education
Buttigieg was the eldest of eight children born to Joseph Anthony and Maria Concetta Buttigieg (née Portelli) in Hamrun, Malta. He began his education in Hamrun, completing undergraduate work and a master's degree at the University of Malta. He earned a second bachelor's degree, a B.Phil., from Heythrop College of the University of London and a Ph.D. in English (1976; with a dissertation on aesthetics in James Joyce's A Portrait of the Artist as a Young Man) from Binghamton University. He was naturalized as a U.S. citizen in 1979.

Career and personal life
Buttigieg taught at New Mexico State University at Las Cruces starting in 1976 and there met Jennifer Anne Montgomery, also a new faculty member. In 1980, they married and also joined the faculty of Notre Dame.

Their son, Pete Buttigieg, was elected as mayor of South Bend, Indiana in 2012, ran for the Democratic nomination as presidential candidate in the 2020 election, and became the Secretary of Transportation under the Biden Administration. Pete said in his first book, Shortest Way Home, that his father was called racial slurs, even though he was European, because of his darker skin.

Buttigieg specialized in modern European literature and theory. He was translator and editor of the three-volume English edition of Marxist philosopher Antonio Gramsci's Prison Notebooks, published from 1992 to 2007 with support from the National Endowment for the Humanities. He was a founding member and president of the International Gramsci Society, founded to facilitate communication between those who study Italian philosopher and politician Antonio Gramsci, one-time leader of the Communist Party of Italy. Buttigieg also served as chair of the English Department at Notre Dame and was promoted to William R. Kenan Jr. Professor of English. He took emeritus status upon retiring in 2017. He died on January 27, 2019.

Bibliography
Criticism Without Boundaries: Directions and Crosscurrents in Postmodern Critical Theory (University of Notre Dame Press, 1987).
A Portrait of the Artist in Different Perspective (Ohio University Press, 1987).
 ed. with Carmel Borg and Peter Mayo, Gramsci and Education (Rowman & Littlefield, 2002).
 ed. with Thomas Kselman, European Christian Democracy: Historical Legacies and Comparative Perspectives (University of Notre Dame Press, 2003).
 ed. and trans. Prison Notebooks (vols. 1–3) by Antonio Gramsci (Columbia University Press, 1992–2007).

References

1947 births
2019 deaths
20th-century American male writers
20th-century American non-fiction writers
20th-century Maltese writers
20th-century translators
21st-century American male writers
21st-century American non-fiction writers
21st-century American translators
Alumni of Heythrop College
University of Malta alumni
American literary theorists
Binghamton University alumni
Italian–English translators
American academics of English literature
Maltese emigrants to the United States
People from Ħamrun
Naturalized citizens of the United States
Pete Buttigieg
University of Notre Dame faculty
English-language writers from Malta
Italian-language writers from Malta
Maltese Marxists